Yongning Subdistrict is a subdistrict in Pukou District, Nanjing, Jiangsu, China. , it has 8 residential communities and 3 villages under its administration.

See also 
 List of township-level divisions of Jiangsu

References 

Township-level divisions of Jiangsu
Geography of Nanjing